Marco Antonio Rubio (born June 16, 1980) is a Mexican former professional boxer who competed from 2000 to 2015. He held the WBC interim middleweight title in 2014, and challenged twice for a middleweight world title in 2009 and 2012.

Professional career

On February 21, 2009 Rubio earned the right to fight for the middleweight title by scoring a split decision victory over Enrique Ornelas to secure the World Boxing Council's # 1 ranking and a shot at the WBC Middleweight title on October 18, 2008 in Atlantic City on the Bernard Hopkins vs. Kelly Pavlik fight card televised portion.

Unified and lineal middleweight world title challenge

On February 21, 2009, Rubio fought for the unified WBC, WBO, Ring magazine, and lineal middleweight titles against Kelly Pavlik. Before the start of the tenth round, Rubio's corner stopped the fight.

Comeback

Rubio then won six fights in a row since he was stopped in the ninth round by middleweight champion Kelly Pavlik in February 2009.

On April 8, 2011 in Bell Centre in Montreal, Quebec, Canada, Rubio was featured in the main event of Friday Night Fights. His opponent was David Lemieux, who came to the fight with an undefeated record. 
Lemieux was the heavy favorite to win in his hometown against the Mexican veteran. During the first five rounds Lemieux dominated Rubio by landing hard power punches. But Rubio refused to quit and wouldn't go down. Rubio came back in round six and started to land harder punches that slowed down Lemieux. In the seventh round Rubio knocked down Lemieux. Lemieux got up, but Rubio continued where he left off and threw more punches at him. With only seconds left in round seven, Lemieux's corner threw in the towel to a stop the fight.

Since he won the Lemieux fight, Rubio placed himself into a mandatory position to face the winner of the fight between titlist Sebastian Zbik of Germany and Mexico's Julio Cesar Chavez Jr., which Chavez won.

Rubio made easy work of journeyman Matt Vanda (44-14, 24 KO’s) on December 16, 2011 with a 5th-round TKO win at the Mandalay Bay Resort and Casino in Las Vegas, Nevada.

WBC middleweight title challenge

Rubio faced Mexican countryman Julio César Chávez Jr. in a scheduled 12-round middleweight bout, for the WBC version of the world title, on Feb. 4 at the Alamodome in San Antonio, Texas. Chávez, Jr. retained the belt, earning a unanimous decision over fellow Mexican Rubio. The judges scored the bout 118-110, 116-112 115-113 for Chávez, Jr., which drew a mixed reaction from the 14,120 in attendance at the Alamodome. Neither fighter went down despite taking continuous heavy blows to the head and body throughout the 12-round bout. Chávez, Jr. overcame a gutsy performance by Rubio despite having some trouble entering the fight.

Personal life
Rubio currently resides in the Mexican border city of Ciudad Acuña, across from Del Rio, Texas. He has vitiligo.

Professional boxing record

References

External links

1980 births
Boxers from Coahuila
Living people
Mexican male boxers
Middleweight boxers
Sportspeople from Torreón
Light-middleweight boxers
Super-middleweight boxers